Karl Hermann Bitter (27 February 1813 – 12 September 1885) was a Prussian statesman and writer on music.

Biography
He was born at Schwedt, Province of Brandenburg, and studied law and cameralistics at Berlin and Bonn. He served as the plenipotentiary of Prussia on the Danube Commission from 1856 to 1860, was prefect of the Department of Vosges during the Franco-Prussian War.

He later became minister of finance (1879), an office in which he displayed exceptional ability. He increased the indirect duties derived from the so-called tobacco monopoly and the tax on spirits and malt, and introduced the “Börsensteuer” (tax on the bourse). He concluded the commercial treaty with the city of Hamburg by which that city entered the German Customs Union. On 25 May 1881 this agreement was signed between Bitter and the State Secretary of the imperial Treasury, on the one hand, Hamburg's Plenipotentiary Senators Versmann and O'Swald, and the envoy of the Hanseatic states in Berlin Dr. Friedrich Krüger, on the other. It stated that Hamburg was ready to accede to the Customs Union with all its territory, but excluding a permanent free port district which it specified. For this district, Article 34 of the imperial constitution would still apply, thus the freedoms of that district could not be abolished or restricted without Hamburg's approval.

He reestablished the stability of the Prussian finances, and took a prominent part in bringing the railroads of Germany under government control. He resigned in 1882, in consequence of differences with Bismarck.

His literary activity was confined almost exclusively to works on music. His Gesammelte Schriften (Collected Writings) appeared in 1884.

Notes

References
 
 

1813 births
1885 deaths
People from Schwedt
People from the Province of Brandenburg
Finance ministers of Prussia
German writers about music
German male non-fiction writers
Humboldt University of Berlin alumni
University of Bonn alumni